Vagani is populated place in Bosnia and Herzegovina, Kotor-Varoš Municipality. At the census year of 1991, in this village there were 370 inhabitants, and in 2013, 113.

Population

References 

Villages in Bosnia and Herzegovina
Populated places in Kotor Varoš